Heshun County is a county of east-central Shanxi province, China. It is under the administration of Jinzhong City.

Climate

References

Official website of Heshun Government
www.xzqh.org 

County-level divisions of Shanxi
Jinzhong